The 2023 FIA Junior World Rally Championship is the twenty-first season of the Junior World Rally Championship, an auto racing championship recognised by the Fédération Internationale de l'Automobile, running in support of the World Rally Championship. The championship features five events, beginning in February at the Rally Sweden and concluding in September at the Acropolis Rally.

Robert Virves and Brian Hoy are the reigning drivers' and co-drivers' champions.

Calendar

Entries
The following crews are set to enter into the Junior World Rally Championship:

Sporting Regulations
The Junior WRC is open for drivers born on or after 1st January 1994 and have not competed as a priority 1 (P1) driver designated to score Manufacturer points before the first JWRC round, no such restrictions are set for co-drivers.

Results and standings

Season summary

Scoring system
Points are awarded to the top ten classified finishers. An additional point is given for every stage win. The best four results out of five count towards the final drivers’ and co-drivers’ standings. However, all points gained from stage wins are retained. Double points are awarded at the season's finale to those with at least 3 previous 2023 JWRC round starts.

FIA Junior World Rally Championship for Drivers

FIA Junior World Rally Championship for Co-Drivers

Notes

References

External links
  
 FIA Junior World Rally Championship 2023 at eWRC-results.com

 
WRC-3
World Rally Championship Junior